Ron D. Dittemore (born April 13, 1952 Cooperstown, New York) is a former Space Shuttle program manager for NASA.

Education 
Ron Dittemore graduated from Medical Lake High School in Medical Lake, Washington in 1970. He received a bachelor's degree in aeronautical and astronautical engineering from the University of Washington in 1974, and a master's degree in the same subjects one year later.

Career 
Before joining NASA at Johnson Space Center (JSC) in 1977, Dittemore worked as a turboprop/turbofan engine development engineer in Arizona. While at JSC, Dittemore held several positions, including flight director on 11 Space Shuttle missions, deputy assistant director of the Space Station Program, and manager of Space Shuttle Program Integration. He assumed the position of manager of the Space Shuttle Program in 1999.

Dittemore was the Shuttle Program Manager for NASA at the time of the disastrous loss of Space Shuttle Columbia in February 2003. Dittemore announced his resignation from NASA in April 2003.

Current Occupation 
Dittemore is currently retired.  Previously, he was the president of ATK Launch Systems Group, formerly known as ATK Thiokol Propulsion, of Brigham City, Utah. ATK (Alliant Techsystems) was selected in December 2005 as the prime contractor for the first stage of NASA's Ares I.

Personal 
Ron Dittemore is married to Shirley Ann Seibolts. They have two children. Dittemore is a member of the Church of Jesus Christ of Latter-day Saints.

References

1952 births
Living people
Latter Day Saints from New York (state)
Dittemore, Ron
University of Washington College of Engineering alumni
People from Cooperstown, New York
People from Medical Lake, Washington
Latter Day Saints from Washington (state)